Nicholas Dunlop is Co-Founder and Secretary-General of the Climate Parliament and founding member of the World Future Council.

Career
Nicholas Dunlop is co-founder and Secretary-General of the Climate Parliament, a global network of Members of Parliament and Congress working to prevent dangerous global warming and promote renewable energy. He was previously Secretary-General of Parliamentarians for Global Action. In 1984, he coordinated the launch of the Six Nation Peace Initiative, bringing together a group of heads of government to work on ending the Cold War and to promote nuclear disarmament. He worked closely for the following five years on various projects with the members of the group: President Raul Alfonsin of Argentina, Prime Ministers Indira Gandhi and Rajiv Gandhi of India, President Miguel de la Madrid of Mexico, President Julius Nyerere of Tanzania, Prime Ministers Olof Palme and Ingvar Carlsson of Sweden, and Prime Minister Andreas Papandreou of Greece. In 1987 he was a co-recipient of the first Indira Gandhi Peace Prize presented by the President of India. More recently, he was executive director of EarthAction, a global network of more than 2,000 citizen groups in 160 countries, working together to generate political will to solve global problems. Working with celebrities such as the actor Leonardo DiCaprio and the rock band Crosby, Stills and Nash, Dunlop has helped to increase public attention to major problems such as climate change and desertification. He has also served as a Consultant to the Administrator of the United Nations Development Programme on relations with national parliaments. In 2007 he was elected a member of the World Future Council, a group of 50 influential individuals from around the globe working to ensure that the rights of future generations are respected in current policy making. Educated in Singapore, India and New Zealand, Nicholas Dunlop is a citizen of New Zealand and Ireland, and is based in England.

References

External links
Nick Dunlop in Clash of the Greens video
Nick Dunlop on Young Asia TV
Nicholas Dunlop speaks about the World Future Council

Living people
Irish chief executives
1956 births